William Robert Johnson (born 7 October 1962) is a former English cricketer.  Johnson was a right-handed batsman who played primarily as a wicketkeeper.  He was born at Iserlohn, West Germany.

Johnson made his Minor Counties Championship debut for Wiltshire in 1984 against Dorset.  From 1984 to 1989, he represented the county in 11 Minor Counties Championship matches, the last of which came against Dorset.  Johnson also represented Wiltshire in the MCCA Knockout Trophy.  His debut in that competition came against Devon in 1985.  He played a further Trophy match for the county in 1989, also against Devon.

Johnson also represented Wiltshire in a single List-A match against Warwickshire in the 1989 NatWest Trophy at Edgbaston.  In his only List-A match, he scored an unbeaten 14*.

References

External links
William Johnson at Cricinfo
William Johnson at CricketArchive

1962 births
People from Iserlohn
Sportspeople from Arnsberg (region)
English cricketers
Wiltshire cricketers
Living people
Wicket-keepers